Duke Dao of Cao (6th century BCE) was the twenty-second ruler of the vassal State of Cao during the Chinese Spring and Autumn period (770 – 475 BCE).

Born as Jī Wŭ (姬午), he was the son of Duke Ping of Cao from whom he inherited the throne from 523 BCE.

Duke Jing of Song captured Duke Dào in 515 BCE and held him prisoner until his death.

Thereafter, disorder broke out in the State of Cáo as Dào’s successors, Duke Sheng of Cao and Duke Yin of Cao, were killed one after the other.

References

Zhou dynasty people
Chinese dukes
6th-century BC Chinese monarchs
6th-century BC births
Year of death unknown
515 BC deaths